Shmuel or Schmuel/ Shmeil is the Hebrew equivalent of the name Samuel. It is popular also in Polish Yiddish versions of the name: Szmul or Szmuel and Szmulik or Szmulek. Shmuel and variations may refer to:

 Samuel (Bible), the Hebrew Bible prophet
 Books of Samuel, the book of the Tanach
 Shmuel Hakatan, the Tanna (Mishnaic sage)
 Samuel of Nehardea, the Amora (Talmudic sage)

People

Given name
 Shmuel Ben David (1884–1927), illustrator, painter, typographer and designer 
 Shmuel Ben-Dror (1924–2009), Israeli footballer
 Shmuel Ben Eliezer (born 1981), American record executive
 Shmuel Bornsztain (disambiguation)
 Shmuel Bornsztain (second Sochatchover rebbe), (1856–1926), author of Shem Mishmuel
 Shmuel Bornsztain (sixth Sochatchover rebbe), (born 1961), Israeli rabbi
 Leonard Chess (born Lejzor Szmuel Czyż; 1917–1969), Polish-born American record company executive 
 Shmuel Dayan (1891–1968), Israeli politician 
 Shmuel Ehrenfeld (1891–1980), rabbi 
 Shmuel Flatto-Sharon (1930–2018), French-Israeli businessman, radio talk-show host and politician
 Samuel Goldwyn (born Szmuel Gelbfisz; 1882–1974), Polish-American film producer
 Szmul Hirsz Peltyn (1831–1896), Polish Jewish writer, translator, and publisher
 Shmuʾel Jamīl (1847–1917), Assyrian scholar and author
 Shmuel Kamenetsky (born 1924), American Haredi rabbi
 Shmuel Kaminetsky (born 1965), chief rabbi of Dnipro and Dnipropetrovsk Oblast 
 Shmuel Kozokin (born 1987), Israeli footballer
 Shmuel Malika-Aharon (1947–2011), Israeli footballer
 Shmuel Onn (born 1960), professor at Technion - Israel Institute of Technology
 Shmuel Pinchasi, rabbi
 Sam Pivnik (born Szmuel Pivnik; 1926–2017), Holocaust survivor, author
 Shmuel Rabinovitch (born 1970), Orthodox rabbi 
 Shmuel Rodensky (1902–1989), Israeli actor 
 Samuel Reshevsky (born Szmul Rzeszewski; 1911–1992), Polish American chess player
 Shmuel Schneersohn (1834–1882), Orthodox rabbi
 Shmuel Yosef Agnon (1888–1970), Nobel Prize laureate writer 
 Sam Warner (born Szmuel Wonsal; 1887–1927), American film producer
 Shmuel Winograd (1936–2019), Israeli-American computer scientist
 Shmuel Zaks (born 1949), computer scientist and mathematician
 Sam Zell (born 1941 as Shmuel Zielonka), American billionaire businessman and philanthropist
 Szmul Zygielbojm (1895–1943), Polish Jewish socialist politician
 Shmuel Zytomirski (1900–1944), figure of the Jewish community of Lublin

Surname
 Midrash Shmuel (disambiguation)
Midrash Shmuel (aggadah), an aggadic midrash on the Books of Samuel
Midrash Shmuel Yeshiva, an English-speaking yeshiva in Jerusalem
 Ya'acov Shmuel (born 1968), Israeli Olympic boxer

Characters
 Shmuel, a character in The Boy in the Striped Pajamas (novel)  and The Boy in the Striped Pyjamas (film)
 Shmuel, a character in the television series The Chosen

See also 
 Shmuel-Bukh, a midrashic verse epic written in Yiddish
 Gan Shmuel, a kibbutz in northern Israel
 Giv'at Shmuel, a city in the Center District of Israel
 Kiryat Shmuel, Haifa, neighborhood at city of Haifa in northern Israel
 For other people named Shmuel or Samuel, see Samuel (name)

Jewish masculine given names
Hebrew masculine given names